Susch (formally Süs) is a village and former municipality in the district of Inn in the Swiss canton of Graubünden. On 1 January 2015 the former municipalities of Lavin and Susch merged into the municipality of Zernez.

The Flüela Pass connects Susch with Davos.

Demographics

Susch had a population of 206 (as of 2014).

See also 
Susch railway station

References

Former municipalities of Graubünden
Populated places on the Inn (river)
Zernez